Carnegia is a genus of moths in the family Saturniidae first described by William Jacob Holland in 1896.

Species
Carnegia mirabilis (Aurivillius, 1895)

References

Saturniinae